1958 Pattern Web Equipment was a modular personal equipment system issued to the British Armed Forces from 1959 up until the mid 90s. It replaced the 1937 Pattern Web Equipment that had served the UK's Armed Forces through the Second World War and the first decade of the Cold War and also the 1944 pattern Webbing which was used in jungle conditions starting from the mid-1960s. It was in turn gradually replaced in the 1990s by 90 and 95 Pattern Personal Load Carrying Equipment (PLCE), though usage in Ministry of Defence-sponsored Community and Combined Cadet Forces persisted into the 2000s. Although replaced, the belt in particular seems to survive as an unofficial form of dress (replacing the general issue Working Belt) by older soldiers when worn with Combat Soldier 95 clothing.

Components 

A standard set of 1958 Pattern webbing as issued to most British personnel consisted of a belt, a yoke that supported the attachment of a shovel or pick, two ammunition pouches to carry magazines for the L1A1 rifle, L2A3 submachine gun, or L4A1-A9 machine gun, linked 7.62mm ammunition for the L7A1/A2 machine gun, and/or L2A1/A2 and other grenades (with the left-hand pouch having provision for carrying a sheathed bayonet and the right-hand pouch having an external pocket to the rear for the ENERGA rifle grenade adapter), a water bottle pouch (also able to be fitted with a mug while containing the waterbottle), a pair of rear "kidney" pouches (for the storage of spare underwear and socks, washing and shaving kit, boot cleaning items, twenty-four-hour rations, and any other items that the user may need to have secured), a poncho roll or "cape carrier", and a large pack. The standard webbing could be altered to take additional pieces of needed equipment, an example of which is the large pack having provision for externally carrying a blanket or sleeping bag and, if not worn, the Mark IV helmet.

There were a number of ancillary pouches and fittings available for soldiers carrying other armament or conducting certain roles, e.g. a holster for the L9A1 and other pistols, a compass pouch, and a binocular case.

All components of the webbing equipment were made from pre-shrunk canvas webbing that was dyed in Standard Camouflage Colour (SCC) 15 Green and could be cleaned through conventional methods (as opposed to the 1908 and 1937 web equipments that used Blanco for both colouration and cleaning; fitting instructions for the 1958 equipment specifically forbade scrubbing or Blancoing of the equipment as well as any attempt to remove the finish on metal parts); the metal fittings were made from anodised dark green aluminium, again requiring less cleaning compared to the brass fittings of earlier web equipments. In its standard configuration, each of the belt-mounted components was secured to the belt by a pair of double hooks (one double hook only in the case of the compass pouch) at the rear, hooked over the belt above and below, with the ends of the hooks further retained in canvas pockets on the inside face of the belt.  However, some pouches, particularly where used by special forces, were fitted or modified with a canvas loop into which the belt was threaded. This method of attachment allowed the pouch to be moved around the belt for the comfort of the user, for example when sitting for long periods.

Several of the individual components evolved over the lifetime of the 1958 Pattern system. There were three iterations of the standard (SLR) ammunition pouches, and two of the water-bottle pouch, poncho roll and yoke.

Usage 

The equipment was worn in a series of combinations. Weapon Training or Skeleton Order consisted of the belt, the yoke, the two ammunition pouches, and the water bottle pouch, becoming Light Fighting Order (LFO) with the addition of the rear pouches and, if desired, the cape carrier. Combat Equipment Fighting Order (CEFO) was the term used for the full webbing equipment (comprising the LFO and cape carrier with the addition of entrenching tools), and once the large pack was attached it became Combat Equipment Marching Order (CEMO). A further informal order, effectively amounting to Skeleton Order without the yoke and with a minimal number of pouches, was often used by soldiers serving in the Aden Emergency and later Operation Banner to aid disembarkation from vehicles; soldiers who were tasked with searching vehicles at security checkpoints often carried a pistol in lieu of a rifle and thus went even further in reducing their webbing, only wearing the belt and the pistol's holster.

Over the course of its service, there were a number of developments and modifications. When the system was originally designed, little scope was given to Nuclear, Biological, and Chemical (NBC) warfare and when this was addressed, the system gained a respirator haversack to house the then issue S6 NBC Respirator.

72 Pattern webbing 

A proposal to replace the 58 pattern was the 72 pattern.

Foreign copies and derivatives

61 pattern webbing 

 61 pattern webbing, A South African copy, used by Rhodesian Forces as 69 pattern.

 1970 pattern webbing, South African equivalent
 Fireforce webbing, Rhodesian webbing

UTV webbing
 UTV webbing, East German equivalent made of nylon/rain camo

Users 

: Primarily used by the Defence Force, also used by the Royal Barbados Police Force contingent of the Caribbean Peace Force
: Used during Ba'athist rule, primarily imported from Pakistan
: Imported from Great Britain; replaced by PLCE webbing by the early 2000s

: Domestically produced

: British Armed Forces (replaced by PLCE in the 1990s) and MOD-sponsored cadet forces (also replaced by PLCE, albeit at a slower rate than the Armed Forces)

See also 
 List of webbing equipment

References

External links 
1988 M. Wright & Sons brochure

British Army equipment
Personal military carrying equipment
Military equipment introduced in the 1950s